Spiro Ristovski (born 6 July 1981) is a Macedonian politician. Minister of Education and Science from 29 May 2013.

Education 
2005 — Graduated from the Faculty of Law “Justinian I”, at the Ss. Cyril and Methodius University of Skopje.

Professional experience 
2005–2006 — Legal representative in the private sector.

2007–2008 — Deputy Manager of the Agency for Supervision of Fully Funded Pension Insurance — MAPAS.

2008–2011 — Deputy Minister of Labor and Social Policy.

2011–2013 — Minister of Labor and Social Policy.

External links 
 Ministry of Education and Science

1981 births
Living people
Politicians from Skopje
Ss. Cyril and Methodius University of Skopje alumni
Government ministers of North Macedonia
VMRO-DPMNE politicians
Macedonian lawyers